Porky's Garden is a 1937 Warner Bros. Looney Tunes animated cartoon directed by Tex Avery. The short was released on September 11, 1937, and stars Porky Pig.* This cartoon's theme is a Looney Tunes theme from 1937, known as Porky Signature theme, but not "The Merry-Go-Round Broke Down", which would be first used as the opening theme in "Rover's Rival". However, a few bars of "The Merry-Go-Round Broke Down" are played when the Podunk fair is introduced. This predates the use of "The Merry-Go-Round Broke Down" as the Looney Tunes theme, and is one of the earliest uses (if not the first) of this song in the Warner Brother's cartoons, the last cartoon that Elmer Wait animated; he died about two months prior to the release. The film entered the Public Domain in 1965.

Plot
An agricultural farm is giving prizes for the person who makes the largest homegrown project. Porky and a rival neighbor both plan to win the agricultural farm prize, Porky with his garden and the neighbor with his chickens. Porky carefully plans a box of seeds, one by one while the man is busy mixing a bunch of bottles of items together. Porky goes to retrieve something as the man feeds the brand new mixture into the feeding bin for his chickens. But when they try it out, they spit the food out in disgust and seek food elsewhere. Porky grabs his bottle of quick grow, a hair tonic he hopes would work on his garden. To his amazement, it does. But he says nothing of it and heads inside his house.

The neighbor checks out his handy work and comments on it, allowing his chickens to come over and eat all of his fruits and vegetables. A little chick and a bigger chicken fight over a watermelon until it flings the chick away. The chick sadly retreats until it sees a bunch of spinach and decides to munch on it instead. The chick then comes back and punches the mean chicken before finishing the watermelon. (The chick eating spinach and then changing is a thinly-veiled Popeye reference).

When his garden has almost entirely been eaten, Porky finally notices the chickens and tries to get rid of them. But alas no luck, so he yells at the neighbor to get them back into his yard but the neighbor claims he doesn't know how they got on Porky's property, then attempts to "try" and make them return. He then leaves while a sad Porky heads to his door, only to find a long vine and follow it to a giant pumpkin.

When the chickens see it, they aim to grab it so Porky brushes right through them all, not allowing any of them to make contact with it. He accidentally drops the pumpkin but catches it when he runs through his entire house. He runs straight for the country fair while the man summons his chicken back and leads them there. As the two of them show up, one of the workers is showing off the talent of a pill he has developed. He gives it to his elephant, turning it into a mouse.

As the neighbor leads his fat and fed chickens to the prize area. One of the bottles pills spills over and the chickens eat all of them, making them grow twice their size. As he arrives, Porky is being awarded first prize. The judge immediately gives the prize to his neighbor instead. But suddenly the chickens shrink and revert to eggs. The "iris out" is interrupted by Porky rightfully grabbing the prize money back from his Italian neighbor.

References

External links
 
Porky's Garden on YouTube
Porky's Garden on BCDB

1937 films
Looney Tunes shorts
Films directed by Tex Avery
American black-and-white films
1930s American animated films
Porky Pig films
1937 animated films
Animated films about animals
Films scored by Carl Stalling
Animated films about birds
Popeye